Manuel 'Manu' Lanzarote Bruno (born 20 January 1984) is a Spanish professional footballer who plays as a left winger or an attacking midfielder.

He amassed Segunda División totals of 151 matches and 37 goals over six seasons, representing Lleida, Sabadell, Alavés and Zaragoza. He made 17 appearances in La Liga with Espanyol, and also played professionally in Greece and India.

Club career
Born in Barcelona, Catalonia, Lanzarote finished his youth career with FC Barcelona, and played his first three years as a senior with the C and B teams. In summer 2005 he signed with neighbouring UE Lleida in Segunda División, but after being sparingly used in the first part of the season, moved to Atlético Madrid B on loan in January 2006.

Lanzarote returned to Lleida in June, but after again seeing limited playing time he joined Real Oviedo also of the third division in January 2007. After being relegated with the Asturians, he signed for UE Sant Andreu from Tercera División.

Lanzarote scored eight goals in his first year with his new club, helping it return to division three at the first attempt. In his second he netted 14 times in all competitions, as the team went on to miss out on two consecutive promotions in the play-offs.

On 19 August 2010, Lanzarote joined CD Atlético Baleares also in the third tier. Twelve days later, he terminated his contract and moved to SD Eibar in the same league after paying his buyout clause of €20,000 himself.

After scoring 11 times for the Armeros, Lanzarote signed with CE Sabadell FC. He played his first game in the second division nearly six years on 27 August 2011, starting in a 2–1 home win against SD Huesca. His first goal came on 26 October, in a 2–2 draw at Xerez CD.

Lanzarote scored 14 goals in the 2012–13 campaign, and on 5 February 2013 he agreed a three-year deal with La Liga side RCD Espanyol, effective as of July. On 24 August he appeared in his first top-flight match, coming on as a late substitute and providing the assist for Thievy's last goal in a 3–1 home victory over Valencia CF.

Lanzarote scored his first goal in the Spanish top tier on 15 September 2013, the game's only away against Granada CF through a free kick. After being rarely used in 2014–15, he was loaned to second-division team Deportivo Alavés on 20 January 2015, until June.

On 2 July 2015, Lanzarote cut ties with Espanyol. Two days later, the 31-year-old moved abroad for the first time in his career and signed for two years with Asteras Tripolis F.C. in Greece. On 29 January 2016, club and player parted ways by mutual consent and he joined Real Zaragoza on a six-month contract the following day.

On 23 August 2017, Lanzarote signed for Indian Super League franchise FC Goa. On 6 June 2018, he moved to fellow league club ATK.

Lanzarote returned to Spain and Sabadell on 14 August 2019, helping in another promotion to the second division. He rejoined Sant Andreu roughly one year later, with the side now in the league below.

On 11 January 2021, Lanzarote joined Chennaiyin FC for the remainder of the season as a injury replacement for Rafael Crivellaro, in a return to the Indian top flight.

Career statistics

References

External links

1984 births
Living people
Spanish footballers
Footballers from Barcelona
Association football midfielders
Association football wingers
La Liga players
Segunda División players
Segunda División B players
Tercera División players
FC Barcelona C players
FC Barcelona Atlètic players
UE Lleida players
Atlético Madrid B players
Real Oviedo players
UE Sant Andreu footballers
CD Atlético Baleares footballers
SD Eibar footballers
CE Sabadell FC footballers
RCD Espanyol footballers
Deportivo Alavés players
Real Zaragoza players
Super League Greece players
Asteras Tripolis F.C. players
Indian Super League players
FC Goa players
ATK (football club) players
Chennaiyin FC players
Spanish expatriate footballers
Expatriate footballers in Greece
Expatriate footballers in India
Spanish expatriate sportspeople in Greece
Spanish expatriate sportspeople in India